Borkhausenia minutella is a species of moth. Within its superfamily, it is placed within the subfamily Oecophorinae of the "concealer moth" family, Oecophoridae.

It is found in Europe, where it is most commonly found in rural landscapes. It is to some extent synanthropic, being regularly found around traditional farms. But apparently, this species is not able to tolerate industrial agriculture well: it has been declining across its range during the 20th century, and it is nowadays entirely extinct in the United Kingdom, where it used to be common in past times, but has not been seen since about 1950.

Its overall coloration is a dark and somewhat metallic slate grey, with two large pale yellow markings on each forewing. The adults fly from May to June depending on the location. The caterpillars feed on seeds and other dry plantstuffs such as dried fruit; they have also been recorded in chicken (Gallus gallus) nests.

See also
List of extinct animals of Britain

Footnotes

References
 Grabe, Albert (1942): Eigenartige Geschmacksrichtungen bei Kleinschmetterlingsraupen ["Strange tastes among micromoth caterpillars"]. Zeitschrift des Wiener Entomologen-Vereins 27: 105–109 [in German]. PDF
 Kimber, Ian (2010): UKMoths – Borkhausenia minutella. Retrieved April 28, 2010.
 Pitkin, Brian & Jenkins, Paul (2004): Butterflies and Moths of the World, Generic Names and their Type-species – Borkhausenia. Version of November 5, 2004. Retrieved April 28, 2010.
 Savela, Markku (2003): Markku Savela's Lepidoptera and some other life forms – Borkhausenia. Version of December 29, 2003. Retrieved April 28, 2010.

Oecophorinae
Moths described in 1758
Taxa named by Carl Linnaeus
Moths of Europe